The Uzbekistan national ice hockey team (Ўзбекистон миллий хоккей терма жамоаси) is the national men's ice hockey team of Uzbekistan. The team is controlled by the Uzbekistan Ice Hockey Federation and has been an associate member of the International Ice Hockey Federation (IIHF) since 26 September 2019. Uzbekistan is currently not ranked in the IIHF World Ranking and has not entered in any IIHF World Championship events, nor at the Olympic Games, but played in three Winter Spartakiads from 1978 to 1986.

History
Uzbekistan, representing the Uzbek Soviet Socialist Republic, played its first game in 1978 during the Winter Spartakiad which was held in Pervouralsk, Soviet Union. They competed in six games against other regions and republics of the Soviet Union. The Uzbek SSR lost all of their games to Leningrad, the Tatar ASSR, Kuibyshev Region, the Latvian SSR and the Bashkir ASSR, but won their game against the Lithuanian SSR 6–1, but their largest recorded victory against club or other team did not count towards Uzbekistan's official international record. In 1982, the Uzbek SSR competed in their second Winter Spartakiad being held in Norilsk. They again competed in six games, again winning only once against the Lithuanian SSR. They lost their other five games against Moscow, Chelyabinsk Oblast, Kuibyshev Region, the Estonian SSR and the Latvian SSR, but their game against the Latvian SSR was recorded as their largest loss against club or other team also did not count. The Uzbek SSR competed in their last competition during the 1986 Winter Spartakiad being held in Krasnoyarsk. They competed in three games, losing all three against Lipetsk Oblast, the Latvian SSR and the Ukrainian SSR. Uzbekistan has not been active since the USSR being dissolved in 1991 and has not played an official game against other national team until 2023.

National team
Uzbekistan played an official game against other national team for the first time. At the 2023 Kazan Hockey Cup in Kazan, Russia, they defeated Bahrain 17–0, their largest victory against other national team. Although their last two games were played against clubs and other teams did not count, they defeated the Saudi Arabian club team, Jeddah Eagles, 4–2, and then a narrowly 3–2 loss to a mixed team from Algeria, Lebanon and Morocco.

Tournament record

World Championships

All-time record against other national teams
Last match update: 14 January 2023

References

External links
IIHF profile
Instagram

 
National ice hockey teams in Asia
Ice hockey